Liu Yan (born August 30, 1984 in Qiqihar, Heilongjiang) is a Chinese former competitive figure skater. She is the 2005 Karl Schäfer Memorial champion, the 2005 Winter Universiade bronze medalist, the 2009 Nebelhorn Trophy bronze medalist, and a five-time (2005, 2007–2010) Chinese national champion. She placed 11th at the 2006 Winter Olympics.

Programs

Competitive highlights

References 

 Liu Yan 2002–2010 Competition results
 2005–2006 Chinese Figure Skating Championships results

External links 

 

1984 births
Living people
Figure skaters at the 2007 Winter Universiade
Figure skaters at the 2006 Winter Olympics
Olympic figure skaters of China
Sportspeople from Qiqihar
Figure skaters at the 2010 Winter Olympics
Figure skaters at the 2007 Asian Winter Games
Universiade medalists in figure skating
Universiade bronze medalists for China
Competitors at the 2009 Winter Universiade